The National Aeronautics and Space Act of 1958 is the United States federal statute that created the National Aeronautics and Space Administration (NASA). The Act, which followed close on the heels of the Soviet Union's launch of Sputnik, was drafted by the United States House Select Committee on Astronautics and Space Exploration and on July 29, 1958 was signed by President Eisenhower. Prior to enactment, the responsibility for space exploration was deemed primarily a military venture, in line with the Soviet model that had launched the first orbital satellite. In large measure, the Act was prompted by the lack of response by a US military infrastructure that seemed incapable of keeping up the space race.

The original 1958 act charged the new Agency with conducting the aeronautical and space activities of the United States "so as to contribute materially to one or more of the following objectives:"

In 2012, a ninth objective was added: 

The Act abolished the National Advisory Committee for Aeronautics (NACA), transferring its activities and resources to NASA effective October 1, 1958.  The Act also created a Civilian-Military Liaison Committee, for the purpose of coordinating civilian and military space applications, and keeping NASA and the Department of Defense "fully and currently informed" of each other's space activities.  To this day, the United States has coordinated but separate military and civilian space programs, with much of the former involved in launching military and surveillance craft and, prior to the Partial Test Ban Treaty, planning counter-measures to the anticipated Soviet launch of nuclear warheads into space.

In addition, the new law made extensive modifications to the patent law and provided that both employee inventions as well as private contractor innovations brought about through space travel would be subject to government ownership.  By making the government the exclusive provider of space transport, the act effectively discouraged the private development of space travel.  This situation endured until the law was modified by the Commercial Space Launch Act of 1984, enacted to allow civilian use of NASA systems in launching space vehicles.

The phrase "We came in peace for all mankind", inscribed on a plaque left on the Moon by the crew of Apollo 11, is derived from the Act's declaration of NASA's policy and purpose:
The Congress hereby declares that it is the policy of the United States that activities in space should be devoted to peaceful purposes for the benefit of all mankind.

The Act was subsequently amended to remove gender bias , so that this policy statement now reads:
Devotion of Space Activities to Peaceful Purposes for Benefit of All Humankind.--Congress declares that it is the policy of the United States that activities in space should be devoted to peaceful purposes for the benefit of all humankind.

See also
 Spinoff history

References

External links

Text of the National Aeronautics and Space Act, via NASA.gov
Overview of Congressional Committee testimony prior to enactment
Dwight D. Eisenhower memorandum to Defense Department regarding creation of NASA and military's role
History of U.S. national space policy

NASA oversight
85th United States Congress
1958 in the United States